Manjiljarra (Manyjilyjarra, Mandjildjara) is one of the Wati languages of the large Pama–Nyungan family of Australia. It is sometimes counted as a dialect of the Western Desert Language, but is classified as a distinct language in Bowern.

It is one of the components of the Martu Wangka koine.

Sign language 

Most of the peoples of central Australia have (or at one point had) signed forms of their languages. Among the Western Desert peoples, sign language has been reported specifically for Manjiljarra, though it is not clear from records how well developed it was.

References

Wati languages
Endangered indigenous Australian languages in Western Australia